WMTY-FM (98.3 FM) is a radio station broadcasting an oldies music format. Licensed to Sweetwater, Tennessee, United States, the station is currently owned by Horne Radio, LLC and features The True Oldies Channel from Citadel Media.

On August 15, 2007 WLOD-FM changed its format from oldies to classic rock, branded as "D 98.3".

On September 1, 2010 WLOD-FM changed its format from classic rock to oldies, branded as "True Oldies". On September 15, 2010 WLOD-FM changed its call letters to WMTY-FM.

References

External links
Oldies 98.3 Online

Oldies radio stations in the United States
MTY-FM
Monroe County, Tennessee